The men's high jump event at the 1981 Summer Universiade was held at the Stadionul Naţional in Bucharest on 21 and 22 July 1981.

Medalists

Results

Qualification
Qualifying mark: 2.16 m

Final

References

Athletics at the 1981 Summer Universiade
1981